Dover Township is a township in Vernon County, in the U.S. state of Missouri.

Dover Township was erected in 1872.

References

Townships in Missouri
Townships in Vernon County, Missouri